Dads Corner, also spelled Dad's Corner, is an unincorporated community in Archer County, in the U.S. state of Texas. According to the Handbook of Texas, its population was 20 in the mid-1960s. It is located within the Wichita Falls metropolitan area.

History
Dads Corner was established during the early 1920s oil boom and was named for oilman C.M. Joiner, who was called "Dad". It declined when the boom slowed down. It had one business in the mid-1930s and had a population of 50 for several decades and had no businesses in the mid-1950s. The population declined to 20 in the mid-1960s. There was one business reported in 1984. A Texas Historical Marker was established in the community two years later. It continued to appear on county maps in 2000. With the county seat of Archer City so close by, it never needed to apply for a post office. Dad's Corner Road is also visible on county maps. It had 22 businesses in 1923, which included a food stand, a hotel, a cafe, stores, and even an ice house. Early residents of the community talked about lawlessness and Texas Rangers patrolling the area. The largest oilfield was located half a mile southeast of the community and many residents worked in the oilfield. It was identified as a ghost town soon after.

Geography

Education
Dads Corner once had its own school. Today, the community is served by the Holliday Independent School District.

References

Unincorporated communities in Texas